Blood on the Dance Floor: HIStory in the Mix is a remix album by American singer-songwriter Michael Jackson. It was released on May 20, 1997, by Epic Records, and is the second album also released by Jackson's own record label, MJJ Productions. The album is made up of eight remixes from Jackson's ninth studio album,  HIStory: Past, Present and Future, Book I (1995), and five new songs. Jackson was heavily involved with the production of the new material while the remixes were produced by other artists. Blood on the Dance Floor: HIStory in the Mix incorporates R&B, pop, industrial, hip hop, house, funk and new jack swing. It concerns themes such as drug addiction, sex, relationships and paranoia.

Though Blood on the Dance Floor: HIStory in the Mix received minimal promotion by Jackson's standards, particularly in the United States, the short film Michael Jackson's Ghosts, two singles ("Blood on the Dance Floor" and "Ghosts"), a promotional single, and a music video were issued as promotion.  Although initial sales in the United States were seen as disappointing for Jackson, the album peaked at number one in France, Belgium, Spain, and New Zealand. Michael Jackson's Ghosts, was premiered at the Cannes Film Festival, as part of Blood on the Dance Floor: HIStory in the Mix's promotion. The short film, also considered the official music video for "Ghosts", won the Bob Fosse Award for Best Choreography in a Music Video.

Reviews at the time of Blood on the Dance Floor: HIStory in the Mix were largely mixed, with some critics feeling that Jackson had already explored these musical themes and others criticising what they perceived as weak vocals. Other critics were more favorable, noting the album for its incorporation of genres Jackson previously hadn't explored, justifying the use of previous themes but with "brutal honesty". Blood on the Dance Floor: HIStory in the Mix has sold over six million copies worldwide, making it the best-selling remix album of all time. On October 20, 2000, it was certified Platinum by the Recording Industry Association of America (RIAA).

Production and music 

The album was produced while Jackson traveled the globe on his HIStory World Tour, due to how impressed he was by Euro-dance remixes in Munich, some of which were financed by Jackson to be extended in order to be included in the album, and Trinidadian beat-music. Thus, the songs were produced in a variety of countries that included Sweden, Switzerland and Germany. The album is made up of eight remixes of songs from HIStory—"Scream", "Money", "2 Bad", "Stranger in Moscow", "This Time Around", "Earth Song", "You Are Not Alone" and "HIStory"—and five new songs—"Blood on the Dance Floor", "Morphine", "Superfly Sister", "Ghosts" and "Is It Scary".

Jackson was heavily involved in the writing, composition and production of the five new songs, and sang all of the lead vocals. Todd Terry remixed "Stranger in Moscow", Jimmy Jam and Terry Lewis remixed "Scream", and The Fugees worked on the new track "Blood on the Dance Floor" and the remix of "2 Bad". Wyclef Jean, a member of The Fugees, told MTV of his involvement in the production, "We did a first remix for Michael, and he wanted us to do another one". The group spoke of their excitement at receiving a phone call from Jackson.

"Morphine" was a particularly dark track which contains an audio clip from The Elephant Man, courtesy of Paramount Pictures. Robert Chausow was a studio violinist working in New York, when he was called on a Sunday morning to travel to the Hit Factory to lay down tracks for an upcoming project. Security at the studio was very tight and Robert had no idea what artist he was playing for. He arrived at the studio which was very dimly lit, sitting with Juliet Hafner, a fellow musician, who happened to know Brad Buxer, longtime producer of Michael Jackson's work. They could both hear Michael Jackson lay down his vocal tracks through the monitor speakers with Brad. After Michael Jackson finished, the musicians were asked to listen to the track a few times and thereafter "Play this. In this part, play eight measures of.....". The two musicians had no clue as to the title of the new track and the experience of playing music in a dark studio was described as surreal. After around an hour to an hour and a half, the musicians were no longer needed. Robert was asked not to talk about the experience until after the project was complete, which was a common request in the studio circuit.<ref name="Book on the Dance Floor">Najar, Brice. Book on the Dance Floor - Let's Make HIStory in the Mix. Independent publishing. p 55.</ref> On this song, Jackson was the sole arranger, doing such to the classical, vocal and orchestral aspects. Jackson also played solo percussion and drums and received joint guitar credit alongside longtime collaborator Slash. Andrae Crouch's choir is also featured on the piece. "Morphine"'s central themes is the drug usage of Demerol. In the track, he sings, "Trust in me/Just in me/Put all your trust in me/You're doin' morphine...Go on babe/Relax/This won't hurt you/Before I put it in/Close your eyes and count to ten/Don't cry/I won't convert you/There's no need to dismay/Close your eyes and drift away".

"Scream Louder" contains elements from "Thank You (Falettinme Be Mice Elf Agin)", performed by Sly & the Family Stone. "2 Bad" contains a recreation of a melody line of Jackson's 1983 hit "Beat It" as well as a rap by John Forté and guitar solo by Wyclef Jean.

 Packaging, release and promotion 
The 23-page album booklet contains the lyrics to "Blood on the Dance Floor", "Stranger in Moscow" and "HIStory". The eight remixes from HIStory are given additional titles such as "Flyte Tyme Remix" and "Tee's In-House Club Mix". The booklet contains many images from the HIStory World Tour and Ghosts film. Towards the end of the booklet, Jackson pays respect to friends such as Elizabeth Taylor and Elton John, his family, employees and fans.

The album was released by Epic Records on May 20, 1997. HIStory on Film, Volume II was released on the same day—a video collection of Jackson's music videos and television performances from the HIStory era of 1995–1997. By Jackson's prior standards, it was not widely promoted upon release. The New York Times described the US promotional effort as "subdued", creating "hardly a sound" and "perplexing to many people in the industry". Jackson's label Epic Records, refuted allegations they were not promoting the album sufficiently in the United States, saying, "We are completely behind the album...Michael is certainly one of our superstars and is treated as such...We just went into this one with our global hats on". The New York Times acknowledged that promotion was stronger internationally, where Jackson had more commercial force and popularity. Jackson effectively no longer needed the US market to have a hit record. By June 1997, only ten percent of sales from Jackson's prior studio album came from within the United States.

The singer released a film titled Ghosts, which he unveiled at the Cannes Film Festival, as part of the album promotion. It was released theatrically in the United States in October 1996; as for the United Kingdom, it debuted at the Odeon Leicester Square in May 1997. The UK event attracted fans, media and business organizations. It was released on cassette in most parts of the world. The film was written by Jackson and Stephen King and directed by Stan Winston. The story was based loosely on the events and isolation Jackson felt after he was accused of child sexual abuse in 1993. In the plot, the Maestro—played by Jackson—is nearly chased out of his town by the residents and the mayor—who deliberately looks very similar to Tom Sneddon—because they believe him to be a "freak". The film had similar imagery and themes to that of Thriller. It features many special effects and dance moves choreographed to original music, which Jackson himself authored. The film includes several songs and music videos from the albums HIStory and Blood on the Dance Floor: HIStory in the Mix. Ghosts is over thirty-eight minutes long and previously held the Guinness World Record for the world's longest music video. It won the Bob Fosse Award for Best Choreography in a Music Video.George, p. 48–50Lewis, p. 125–126

The album was also promoted with the singles "Blood on the Dance Floor" and "HIStory/Ghosts" as well as three corresponding music videos. The video for "Blood on the Dance Floor" premiered on Top of the Pops. It centered on Susie seducing Jackson in a courtship dance, before opening a switchblade. The lead single peaked at number one in several countries, including the United Kingdom. The double A-side "HIStory/Ghosts" was promoted with a video for each song. "HIStory" was set in a nightclub, in a futuristic era, and recalled Jackson's filmography. "Ghosts" was a five-minute clip taken from the much longer film Ghosts. The double A-side would become a top five hit in the United Kingdom, but did not chart as highly elsewhere.

 Commercial performance 
Initial sales in the United States were seen as disappointing for Jackson. It peaked at number 24 on the US Billboard 200 chart and after four weeks the record had sold 92,000 copies. Despite this, long term sales were stronger, it was certified platinum in May 2000, for shipments of at least a million units. It was certified Gold in Canada for a minimum of 50,000 shipments.

In Europe the record has been certified for shipments of at least two million copies. Blood on the Dance Floor: HIStory in the Mix debuted atop the UK album chart, by July 1997 it had sold 250,000 units in the United Kingdom and 445,000 units in Germany. The album also peaked at number one in France, Belgium, Spain and New Zealand. Since its debut, the album has sold an estimated six million copies worldwide, making it the best selling remix album ever released.

 Critical reception 

Jim Farber of New York Daily News labeled the album's theme, "Predatory women, jealous underlings and the evil media continue to obsess him. He's once again playing the victim—the world's most powerless billionaire, it seems—mewling about forces conspiring against his heavenly self." He said of the lead single, "[Jackson] coughs up a series of strangulated mutters and munchkin hiccups in lieu of a vocal, while its chilly, faux-industrial music proves as appealing as a migraine." He continued, "'Ghosts' and 'Is It Scary' boast a few innovative sounds but no real melodies." Thor Christensen of The Dallas Morning News noted the album focused on "angry tales about a coldhearted 'Superfly Sister' or the back-stabbing women in 'Ghosts' and 'Blood on the Dance Floor'. Three of the five new songs on this remix album...involve mean, psychotic ex-lovers". He observed, "The dark, cryptic 'Morphine' is easily one of the most ambitious songs he's ever recorded. He fuels the song with narcotic industrial funk—lookout Trent Reznor—but then dilutes it by sticking [in] 90 seconds of goopy, string-laden balladry."

Neil Strauss of The New York Times gave the album a positive review, saying the record, "put Mr. Jackson halfway on the road to a very interesting concept album. There is real pain and pathos in these new songs...[he] frets about painkillers, sexual promiscuity and public image. In many of them, Mr. Jackson seems like The Elephant Man, screaming that he is a human being...With beats crashing like metal sheets and synthesizer sounds hissing like pressurized gas, this is industrial funk." He favorably compared Jackson's performance of "Is It Scary" to rock singer Marilyn Manson and noted the lyrics, "If you want to see eccentric oddities, I'll be grotesque before your eyes". Strauss suggested that the predatory woman, "Susie", from the title track, was a metaphor for AIDS. Finally, he described "Morphine" as "chilling... Mr. Jackson sings seductively from the point of view of the drug itself...he intones sweetly".
 Roger Catlin of The Hartford Courant stated, "The most intriguing pairing is 'Ghosts' and 'Is It Scary' in which he asks those who've only read about him in tabloids if he seems monstrous." The Cincinnati Post described the lead single as a "lackluster first release...dated, played-out dance track", but gave the album an overall favorable analysis. The review described "Ghosts" and "Is It Scary" as "classic Jackson paranoia".

Anthony Violenti of The Buffalo News said of the lead single, "[it is] laced with Teddy Riley's new jack swing sound and a pounding techno beat". Violenti added, "'Superfly Sister', 'Ghosts' and 'Is It Scary' are programmed plastic soul that makes you wonder how someone as talented as Jackson can churn out such tracks". He said of "Morphine", "[it] has more synthesized beats and quickly fades into Jackson's current indistinguishable style". Music critic, Adam Gilham was particularly impressed with the musical sequence of the track, noting that Michael Jackson created a "moment of absolute genius". William Ruhlman of AllMusic said of the lead track, "'Blood on the Dance Floor' is an uptempo Jackson song in the increasingly hysterical tradition of 'Billie Jean' and 'Smooth Criminal' with Jackson huffing, puffing, and yelping through some nonsense about a stabbing...over a fairly generic electronic dance track. Stephen Thomas Erlewine, also of AllMusic, had a negative reaction to the record. He said that all five new tracks were, "embarrassingly weak, sounding tired, predictable and, well, bloodless". He described "Blood on the Dance Floor" as a "bleak reworking of 'Jam' and 'Scream'".

Chris Dickinson of St. Louis Post-Dispatch, noted, "'Superfly Sister' comes on like a classic Michael dance track, with Michael and Bryan Loren playing all the instruments...Blood On the Dance Floor [album] is definitely a dance record. It's not Thriller or Bad or even Off the Wall and it's not trying to be." Jae-Ha Kim of Chicago Sun-Times, noted "'Is It Scary' shows a darker side of Jackson than even the tabloids would have you believe...With the hypnotic 'Morphine', he sounds like a seductive cousin of Trent Reznor's." Sonia Murray of The Atlanta Journal and The Atlanta Constitution gave the album a D grade. She claimed that "'Ghosts' pounds with funk until Jackson's weak vocals come in." She described "Morphine" as an "overblown rock hiss". The Virginian-Pilot gave the album a positive review, also expressing the opinion that "Morphine" sounded "eerily like 'State of Shock'", and continued, "'Scream Louder' a remix of his hit duet with sister Janet, is better than the original only because it takes away the overpowering guitar twangs." The Washington Post described "Superfly Sister" as "sex funk", adding, "'Morphine' apparently told from the drug's point of view and featuring both the Andrae Crouch Singers and an orchestra, alternates between a hard-edged rock and operatic pop."

 Retrospective reception 
A Jackson biographer, J. Randy Taraborrelli, gave a retrospective analysis of the album in the biography, The Magic & the Madness. He felt the album "contained...kick-ass dance remixes...Several of the other songs on Blood are also memorable...The collection was not a success in America; it was dismissed by critics and much of his audience, who seemed confused as to whether it was a new release or some kind of hybrid combination of songs". He felt that "Blood on the Dance Floor" was one of Jackson's best songs, but that the US public was more interested in the controversial tabloid stories about his personal life.

William Ruhlman of AllMusic, agreed that part of the blame for a perceived commercial disappointment in the United States could be attributed to the ongoing public interest in the singer's private life. Nonetheless, Ruhlman still felt the album was artistically disappointing. In 2005, J T Griffith, of AllMusic, believed that in hindsight, "Blood on the Dance Floor" was actually a good song. He explained, "[it is] a second-rate mixture of 'Beat It' and 'Thriller' but Jackson's missteps are better than most pop music out there. This track showcases all the artist's trademarks: the ooohing, the grunts, and funky basslines. It is hard to hear 'Blood on the Dance Floor' and not want to moonwalk or dance like a ghoul".

 Track listing 

 "Morphine" is retitled "Just Say No" on some licensed editions of the album.
 Both "Is It Scary" and "Ghosts" share certain lyrics.
 The LP version replaces "This Time Around (D.M. Radio Mix)" and "You Are Not Alone (Classic Club Mix)" with "This Time Around (D.M. Mad Club Mix)" (the version on the LP is different from the mix of the same title on the single release of the song) and "You Are Not Alone (Classic Club Edit)", respectively.

 Personnel 

"Blood on the Dance Floor"
Written, composed, and produced by Michael Jackson and Teddy Riley
 Engineered by Teddy Riley, Dave Way and Mick Guzauski
 Mixed by Mick Guzauski
 Keyboard, synthesizer, drum programming by Brad Buxer and Teddy Riley

"Morphine" (Originally Titled "Just Say No")
Written by, Composed by, Arranged by, lead and backing vocals, guitar, percussion, drums by Michael Jackson
 Guitar performed by Slash
 Engineered by Keith Cohen, Eddie DeLena, Mick Guzauski and Tim Boyle
 Mixed by Keith Cohen
 Keyboards by Brad Buxer and Keith Cohen
 Percussion by Brad Buxer and Bryan Loren
 Synthesizer, grand piano by Brad Buxer

"Superfly Sister"
Written and produced by Michael Jackson
Composed and arranged by Michael Jackson and Bryan Loren
 Recorded by Richard Cottrell and Dave Way
 Rhythm guitar, soloist (guitar), drum programming,  programmed by, keyboards,  synthesizer by Bryan Loren

"Ghosts"
Written, composed, and produced by Michael Jackson and Teddy Riley
 Engineered by Teddy Riley and Eddie DeLena
 Mixed by Dave Way
 Drum programming by Alex Breuer, Andrew Scheps, Doug Grigsby, Matt Carpenter and Rob Hoffman
 Keyboards, synthesizer by Brad Buxer, Doug Grigsby and Teddy Riley

"Is It Scary"
Written and composed by Michael Jackson, James Harris III and Terry Lewis
 Produced by Jimmy Jam & Terry Lewis, and Michael Jackson
 Arrangement by Michael Jackson, Jimmy Jam & Terry Lewis
 Vocal arrangement by Michael Jackson
 All instruments performed by Jimmy Jam & Terry Lewis, Michael Jackson 
 Recorded and mixed by Steve Hodge
 Drum programming by Jeff Taylor
 Piano by Michael Jackson

"Scream Louder (Flyte Tyme Remix)"
Written and composed by James Harris III and Terry Lewis, Michael Jackson and Janet Jackson
 Produced by Jimmy Jam & Terry Lewis, Michael Jackson and Janet Jackson
 Additional production and remix by Jimmy Jam & Terry Lewis

"2 Bad (Refugee Camp Mix)"
Song and lyrics written by Michael Jackson
Music composed by Bruce Swedien, René Moore and Dallas Austin
 Produced by Michael Jackson, Jimmy Jam & Terry Lewis
 Remix and guitar by Wyclef Jean
 Additional production by Te-Bass and Pras
 Rap by John Forte
 Bass by Te-Bass
 Mixed and engineered by Warren Riker
 Scratches by Funkmaster Flex

"Stranger in Moscow (Tee's In-House Club Mix)"
Written, composed, and produced by Michael Jackson
 Additional production and remix by Todd Terry
 Engineered by Bill Klatt
 Edited by Matthias Heilbronn

"This Time Around (D.M. Radio Mix)"
Song & lyrics written by Michael Jackson
Music composed by Dallas Austin
 Produced by Dallas Austin and Michael Jackson
 Remix and additional production by David Morales
 Engineered by David Sussman
 Keyboards by Satoshi Tomiie and Joe Moskowitz
 Horns arranged by Paul Sharipo & Company
 Percussion by Steve Thornton

"Earth Song (Hani's Club Experience)"
Written and composed by Michael Jackson
 Produced by Michael Jackson, Bill Bottrell and David Foster
 Remixed and recycled by Hani
 Edited by Vlado Meller and Frank Ceraolo

"You Are Not Alone (Classic Club Mix)"
Written and composed by R. Kelly
 Produced by R. Kelly and Michael Jackson
 Remix by Frankie Knuckles
 Additional production by Frankie Knuckles and Satoshi Tomiie
 Engineered by John Poppo
 Keyboard programming by Terry Burrus

"Money (Fire Island Radio Edit)"
Written, composed, and produced by Michael Jackson
 Remix and additional production by Terry Farley & Pete Heller
 Engineered by Gary Wilkinson

"HIStory (Tony Moran's HIStory Lesson)"
Written and composed by Michael Jackson, James Harris III and Terry Lewis
 Produced by Michael Jackson, Jimmy Jam & Terry Lewis
 Remix by Tony Moran
 Additional production by Tony Moran and Bob Rosa
 Mixed by Bob Rosa
 Engineered and programming by Tony Coluccio
 Additional programming by Giuseppe D.

Charts

 Weekly charts 

Year-end charts

Certifications and sales

 See also 
 HIStory World Tour
 List of best-selling remix albums worldwide

 Notes 

 References 
 George, Nelson (2004). Michael Jackson: The Ultimate Collection'' booklet. Sony BMG.
 
 
 

1997 remix albums
Michael Jackson albums
Albums produced by Michael Jackson
Albums produced by Bill Bottrell
Albums produced by Dallas Austin
Albums produced by David Foster
Albums produced by Jimmy Jam and Terry Lewis
Albums produced by R. Kelly
Albums produced by Teddy Riley
Epic Records remix albums